Moswansicut Pond Site, RI-960 is an historic site in Scituate, Rhode Island

The site offers prehistoric archaeological evidence and was added to the National Historic Register on September 12, 1985.

References

Scituate, Rhode Island
National Register of Historic Places in Providence County, Rhode Island
Archaeological sites on the National Register of Historic Places in Rhode Island